Boekerton is an unincorporated community in New Madrid County, in the U.S. state of Missouri.

History
A post office called Boekerton was established in 1905, and remained in operation until 1918. The community has the name of the local Boeker family.

References

Unincorporated communities in New Madrid County, Missouri
Unincorporated communities in Missouri